Devinder Dutt Sharma (born 20 January 1950) is a former Indian cricket umpire. He stood in one ODI game in 2001.

See also
 List of One Day International cricket umpires

References

1950 births
Living people
Indian One Day International cricket umpires
Place of birth missing (living people)